Erika Polidori (born January 26, 1992) is a Canadian softball player.

Playing career
Polidori competed at the 2015 Pan American Games in Toronto, winning the gold medal, and again at the 2019 Pan American Games in Lima, winning silver. 

In June 2021, Polidori was named to Canada's 2020 Olympic team.

Personal life
Besides being a softball player, Polidori is also a nurse.

References

External links
 Oakland Golden Grizzlies bio

1992 births
Living people
Canadian softball players
Competitors at the 2022 World Games
Softball players at the 2015 Pan American Games
Softball players at the 2019 Pan American Games
Medalists at the 2015 Pan American Games
Medalists at the 2019 Pan American Games
Pan American Games gold medalists for Canada
Pan American Games silver medalists for Canada
Sportspeople from Brantford
Sportspeople from London, Ontario
Oakland Golden Grizzlies softball players
Softball players at the 2020 Summer Olympics
Olympic softball players of Canada
Medalists at the 2020 Summer Olympics
Olympic bronze medalists for Canada
Olympic medalists in softball
Pan American Games medalists in softball